(144898) , provisional designation , is a sub-kilometer asteroid, classified as near-Earth object of the Apollo group once thought to have a low probability of impacting Earth on 4 May 2102. It reached a Torino Scale rating of 2 and a Palermo Technical Impact Hazard Scale rating of -0.25. With an observation arc of 17 years it is known that closest Earth approach will occur two days earlier on 2 May 2102 at a distance of about 5.5 million km.

History 
 was discovered on 7 November 2004, by the NASA-funded LINEAR asteroid survey.

Being approximately 580 meters in diameter, if  were to impact land, it would create an impact crater about 10 kilometres wide and generate an earthquake of magnitude 7.4.

Elevated risk estimate in 2006 
From February to May 2006,  was listed with a Torino Scale impact risk value of 2, only the second asteroid in risk-monitoring history to be rated above value 1. With an observation arc of 1511 days, it was estimated to have a 1 in 1320 chance of impacting on 4 May 2102. The Torino rating was lowered to 1 after additional observations on 20 May 2006, and finally dropped to 0 on 17 October 2006.

2008 observations 
As of 4 January 2008, the Sentry Risk Table assigned  a Torino value of 0 and an impact probability of 1 in 58.8 million for 4 May 2102. This value was far below the background impact rate of objects this size. Further observations allowed it to be removed from the Sentry Risk Table on 14 February 2008.

It will pass  from the Earth on 1 May 2032, allowing a refinement to the orbit.

Properties 
It has a spectral type of E. This suggests that the asteroid has a high albedo and is on the smaller size range for an object with an absolute magnitude of 18.8.

See also 
 3103 Eger, possible parent of the Aubrite asteroids
 99942 Apophis
 Asteroid impact avoidance
 Aubrite asteroid family
 E-type asteroid
 Hungaria family of asteroids
 List of exceptional asteroids

References

External links 
 
 
 

144898
144898
144898
Near-Earth objects removed from the Sentry Risk Table
20041107